Cochleanthes aromatica is a species of orchid.

References

aromatica